Pyropyxis is a genus of fungi in the family Pyronemataceae. It was circumscribed in 1984 by Keith Egger, to contain the single species Pyropyxis rubra. This species was originally described by Charles Horton Peck in 1872 as a species of Peziza. Fruit bodies of the fungus are cup shaped, with a pink to reddish-orange color. Pyropyxis has a Dichobotrys anamorph. The genus name, said to be derived from the Greek word for "fire" (pyros) and the Latin word pyxis, refers to the segregation of this species from the genus Geopyxis. The proper word in ancient Greek for "fire" is however pyr (πῦρ). Pyropyxis rubra is found in North America, where it grows as a saprophyte on burned forest litter in both mixed and deciduous forests.

References

Pyronemataceae
Pezizales genera
Fungi of the United States
Fungi of Canada